Fotis Konstantinidis (born 25 July 1978) is a Greek footballer. Began his professional football career with Panserraikos F.C. in November 1997. He played as a footballer of Panthrakikos F.C. for 5 years, winning 2 elevation from Gamma Ethniki to Super League (third to first level).

Career

Career statistics

Last update: 27 Nov 2011

Notes

References
 Guardian Football

1978 births
Living people
Greek footballers
Panserraikos F.C. players
Panthrakikos F.C. players
Association football defenders